Allahabad (also Romanized as Allāhābād) is a village in Golshan Rural District, in the Central District of Tabas County, South Khorasan Province, Iran. At the 2006 census, its population was 250, in 67 families.

References 

Populated places in Tabas County